Marsh banksia is a common name for several plants and may refer to:

 Banksia pilostylis, endemic to Western Australia
 Banksia telmatiaea, native to Western Australia

Banksia taxa by common name